Three ships of the French Navy have borne the name of La Combattante ("the Fighter", or "Fighting one"):
 A galley which took part in the raid against Teignmouth in August 1690 and destroyed numerous English ships there
 The FNFL destroyer , a type III  leased by the UK.
 The patrol boat , decommissioned in September 1996.

French Navy ship names